Stránka is a municipality and village in Mělník District in the Central Bohemian Region of the Czech Republic. It has about 200 inhabitants.

Administrative parts
Villages of Ostrý and Tajná are administrative parts of Stránka.

References

Villages in Mělník District